"The Man" is a slang phrase, used in the United States, that may refer to the government or to some other authority in a position of power. In addition to this derogatory connotation, it may serve as a term of respect and praise.

The phrase "the Man is keeping me down" is commonly used to describe oppression. The phrase "stick it to the Man" encourages resistance to authority, and essentially means "fight back" or "resist", either passively, openly or via sabotage.

History
As an English phrase meaning "the boss" it dates from at least 1918. In the Hebrew Bible, the phrase, Ha Ish meaning 'the Man', is used by Joseph's brothers (Gen 42: 30,33; 43:3,5) to refer to the viceroy of Egypt (who ironically is Joseph).

In the Southern U.S., the phrase came to be applied to any man or any group in a position of authority, or to authority in the abstract. From about the 1950s the phrase was also an underworld code word for police, the warden of a prison or other law enforcement or penal authorities. The term is used several times by Paul Newman's eponymous character in the 1967 prison drama Cool Hand Luke.

The use of this term was expanded to counterculture groups and their battles against authority, such as the Yippies, which, according to a May 19, 1969 article in U.S. News & World Report, had the "avowed aim ... to destroy 'The Man', their term for the present system of government". The term eventually found its way into humorous usage, such as in a December 1979 motorcycle ad from the magazine Easyriders which featured the tagline, "California residents: Add 6% sales tax for The Man." In the 1969 song "Proud Mary" by Creedence Clearwater Revival, the singer finds protection from "the man" and salvation from his working-class pains in the nurturing spirit and generosity of simple people who "are happy to give" even "if you have no money."

In present day, the phrase has been popularized in commercials and cinema. It was featured particularly prominently as a recurring motif in the 2003 film School of Rock. The film Undercover Brother had as a plot element a fictional organization headed by "The Man", an actual man in charge of oppressing African Americans. In January 2021, the GameStop short squeeze was primarily triggered to "fight the man" by users of the subreddit r/wallstreetbets, an Internet forum on the social news website Reddit, some of whom held anger towards Wall Street hedge funds for their role in the financial crisis of 2007 and 2008, and the general democratization of the stock market coupled with the ability of retail traders to communicate instantaneously through social media.

Use as praise

The term has also been used as an approbation or form of praise. This may refer to the recipient's status as the leader or authority within a particular context, or it might be assumed to be a shortened form of a phrase like "He is the man (who is in charge)."

In more modern usage, it can be a superlative compliment ("you da man!") indicating that the subject is currently standing out amongst their peers even though they have no special designation or rank, such as a basketball player who is performing better than the other players on the court. It can also be used as a genuine compliment with an implied, slightly exaggerated or sarcastic tone, usually indicating that the person has indeed impressed the speaker but by doing something relatively trivial.

The phrase has also been used in professional wrestling to refer to the top stars in the business. Some notable examples include Ric Flair, Stan Hansen, and Becky Lynch.

See also
 Big Brother (Nineteen Eighty-Four)
 Big man (political science) 
 Ruling class
 The Establishment
 Power elite

Notes

References
 Lighter, J.E. (Ed.). (1997). Random House Dictionary of American Slang. New York: Random House.

English-language slang
Stock characters
English-language idioms
Political slurs